"Focus" is a song by American singer Bazzi featuring rapper 21 Savage, released as a single through Atlantic Records on June 13, 2019. It is the second single from Bazzi's debut mixtape Soul Searching.

Critical reception
HotNewHipHop said the track "has all the makings of a successful crossover hit" and could be "picked up by pop radio as well as the typical hip-hop stations".

Promotion
Bazzi teased the song in June 2019, asking his followers if they wanted new music with a "special guest".

Charts

Certifications

References

2019 songs
2019 singles
Bazzi (singer) songs
21 Savage songs
Songs written by Bazzi (singer)
Songs written by 21 Savage